A referendum on political reform was held in Spain on Wednesday, 15 December 1976, to gauge support for either the ratification or repealing of the Political Reform Act which had been approved by the Cortes Españolas on 18 November 1976. The question asked was "Do you approve of the Political Reform Bill?". The referendum resulted in 97.4% of valid votes in support of the bill on a turnout of 77.7%.

Purpose
The Political Reform Act was the last of the Fundamental Laws of the Realm and was approved by the Cortes on 18 November 1976. Its aim was to move away from the dictatorship of the Franco era and turn Spain into a constitutional monarchy with a parliament system based on representative democracy. It had been drafted by the President of the Cortes Españolas, Torcuato Fernández-Miranda (including changes that would replace the Cortes Españolas with a Cortes Generales), and supported by Prime Minister Adolfo Suárez and King Juan Carlos. The law provided for the legalisation of political parties and a democratic election to Constituent Cortes, a committee of which then drafted the Constitution.

Opinion polls
The table below lists voting intention estimates in reverse chronological order, showing the most recent first and using the dates when the survey fieldwork was done, as opposed to the date of publication. Where the fieldwork dates are unknown, the date of publication is given instead. The highest percentage figure in each polling survey is displayed with its background shaded in the leading choice's colour. The "Lead" columns on the right show the percentage-point difference between the "Yes" and "No" choices in a given poll.

Results

Overall

Results by region

References

External links
Text of political reform law 

Referendums in Spain
1976 referendums
1976 in Spain
Reform in Spain